The eighth series of the French talent competition programme La France a un incroyable talent was broadcast on M6 from 15 October to 10 December 2013. At the end of the seventh season, hosts Alex Goude and Sandrine Corman announced that there would indeed be a return. M6 then confirmed the announcement, sharing details of open auditions, and that everyone wishing to participate could register on the website.

Series overview 

For the 8th series, the show hired new judge Andrée Deissenberg, director of the Crazy Horse Saloon. The Season, once again, was presented by Alex Goude and Sandrine Corman, while sister show La France a un incroyable talent, It Continues was presented by Jérôme Anthony. Joining Deissenberg, all three judges came back from the previous season, Gilbert Rozon, Sophie Edelstein and Dave. 

This time, the winner would receive a check for €100,000 & would be part of the upcoming Just for Laughs festival. As well as this, they would also become part of judge Dave's concert.

The auditions for series 8 took place in Issy-les-Moulineaux from 22 August to 27 August 2013. 

In the Semi-Finals, unlike previous years, the contestants weren't divided into groups. At the end of the show, two contestants were selected to advance to the final, via a public vote. Then, the judging panel were given some time to deliberate their choice of two contestants to advance from the remaining eight. The first semi-final had considerably poor viewership, however this was down to the show being broadcast at the same time as the France - Ukraine match in the 2014 FIFA World Cup.

Semi-final Summary

Semi-final 1

Semi-final 2

Semi-final 3

Final Summary

France
2013 French television seasons